Chrysoesthia compositella is a moth of the family Gelechiidae. It is found in Algeria.

The wingspan is 13–16 mm. The forewings are whitish, with brownish-black and ochreous-yellow scales. The hindwings are whitish.

References

Moths described in 1915
Chrysoesthia